Mohamed Ait Abbou (born August 23, 1985) is a Moroccan footballer.

References 

Moroccan footballers
1985 births
Living people
Footballers from Casablanca
Kawkab Marrakech players
Moroccan expatriate footballers
Expatriate footballers in Kuwait
Expatriate footballers in Bahrain
Moroccan expatriate sportspeople in Kuwait
Moroccan expatriate sportspeople in Bahrain
Ittihad Tanger players
Al Hala SC players
Association football defenders
Al Salmiya SC players
Kuwait Premier League players
Al-Baqa'a Club players